Kentucky Route 94 (KY 94) is a  state highway in Kentucky that runs from Tennessee State Route 78 at the  Tennessee state line to KY 80 southwest of the unincorporated community of Aurora via Hickman, Water Valley, and Murray.

Major intersections

Special routes

Kentucky Route 94 Spur (Calloway County)

Kentucky Route 94 Spur (known as KY 94C for identification purposes) is a 0.385-mile spur route of Kentucky Route 94 in rural Calloway County northeast of Murray that connects KY 94 to Kentucky Route 80.

Major intersections

Kentucky Route 94 Spur (Fulton County) 

Kentucky Route 94 Spur (known as KY 94C for identification purposes) is a 0.312-mile spur route of Kentucky Route 94 in rural Fulton County halfway between Crutchfield and Fulton that connects KY 94 to U.S. Route 51.

Major intersections

References

0094
Transportation in Graves County, Kentucky
Transportation in Calloway County, Kentucky
Transportation in Marshall County, Kentucky